Lachhmi Dhar Shastri Kalla was Reader of Sanskrit at St. Stephen's College, the University of Delhi, and head of the Department of Sanskrit from 1922 to 1949.

Works
The Home of the Aryas: With Notes, References and Appendices, 1930, University of Delhi (2002), 
 The birthplace of Kalidasa: With notes, references, and appendices, etc. 	
All-India Kashmiri Pandit social reform movement: An appeal for social reform among the Kashmiris : leading opinions of the members of the Kashmiri community, 1931 	
The Vedic paddhati: As current among the Kashmiri Pandits, 1932

References

Indian Sanskrit scholars